Corkery is a surname. Notable people with the surname include:

Briege Corkery (born 1986), Irish camogie player and Gaelic footballer
Colin Corkery, Irish Gaelic footballer
Daniel Corkery (Irish republican) (1883–1961), Irish politician
Daniel Corkery (author) (1878–1964), Irish politician, writer and academic
David Corkery (born 1972), Irish rugby union player
James Corkery (1889–?), Canadian long-distance runner
KC Corkery (born 1983), American tennis player
Matthew Corkery (born 1965), Australian rugby league player
Niall Corkery, Irish Gaelic footballer
Pam Corkery (born 1956), New Zealand journalist, broadcaster and politician
Stella Corkery (born 1960), New Zealand artist